The Punan languages or Rejang-Sajau languages are a group of mutually intelligible isolects spoken by the Punan and related peoples of Borneo in Indonesia and Malaysia.

Classification
Smith (2017) classifies Punan dialects as follows:
Sru (Seru) †
Punan Tubu-Bah
Punan Tubu, Punan Bah, Sajau, Latti
Punan
Beketan (Bukitan), Punan Lisum, Punan Aput, Ukit, Buket (Bukat)

Austroasiatic influence
Kaufman (2018) notes that some Proto-Punan words (Smith 2017) are of likely Austroasiatic origin, including the following.

 *-iap ‘count’
 *hen ‘3. pronoun’
 *buhak ‘white’
 *obet ‘animal trap (general)’

References